The 2010 New Year's Eve tornado outbreak was a three-day-long tornado outbreak that impacted the central and lower Mississippi Valley from December 30, 2010 to January 1, 2011. Associated with a low pressure system and a strong cold front, 37 tornadoes tracked across five states over the length of the severe event, killing nine and injuring several others. Activity was centered in the states of Missouri and later Mississippi on December 31. Seven tornadoes were rated EF3 on the Enhanced Fujita Scale; these were the strongest during the outbreak. Non-tornadic winds were recorded to have reached as high as 80 mph (130 km/h) at eight locations on December 31, while hail as large as 2.75 in (7.0 cm) was documented north-northeast of Mansfield, Missouri. Overall, damage from the outbreak totaled US$123.3 million, most of which was related to tornadoes. This is the most prolific tornado outbreak in Missouri in the month of December.

The United States Storm Prediction Center first noted a possible New Year's Eve severe weather event as early as December 25, 2010. These forecasts gained confidence as the event approached, with a focus on the Ozarks and adjacent areas. Supercells developed in this area during the night of December 30 and tracked across central Missouri, producing several tornadoes and large hail. However, the bulk of activity during the outbreak was a result of a long line of supercells that tracked from Oklahoma to Illinois, producing five EF3 tornadoes. One of these tracked through northwestern Arkansas, killing four. Another tore through eastern sections of Fort Leonard Wood in Missouri, destroying 159 homes and causing US$90 million in damage, making it the costliest tornado of the outbreak. A separate cluster of storms later developed in Louisiana before tracking into Mississippi, producing several tornadoes across southern and central regions of the state on January 1.

Meteorological synopsis

The Storm Prediction Center (SPC) began to note the possibility that a severe weather event could develop on December 30 as early as December 25, 2010. Nonetheless, the predictability of the event was too low as the event was several days out. As the anticipated event grew closer, confidence in the forecast slowly increased, though uncertainties in the timing and extent of the tornado outbreak still existed. These uncertainties remained through December 29 with forecasts calling for only marginal hail and possibly damaging gusts. However, the SPC indicated that discrete tornadic supercells and more severe thunderstorms could result from atmospheric conditions deviating slightly from the forecast. In contrast, forecasts were more confident in a widespread outbreak of severe weather for New Year's Eve; the SPC issued a slight risk outlook for much of the Lower Mississippi Valley and the Ozarks as a result.

Atmospheric conditions remained only marginally conducive for the development of thunderstorms on the morning of December 30. Throughout the day, moisture was drawn from the Gulf of Mexico northward into the Ozarks region. However, the presence of a capping inversion prevented thunderstorms from developing. During the evening of December 30, an area of strong wind shear developed near the Ark-La-Tex and southeastern Oklahoma area well ahead of a nearing cold front, providing a focal point for potential storm development. Late that day, scattered thunderstorms developed over eastern Oklahoma and northern Arkansas, producing significant hail. Over the next few hours and into December 31, these storms would intensify as they moved into southwestern Missouri, producing four tornadoes. The first tornado watch issued in association with the severe event was issued at 07:06 UTC on December 31 as these storms tracked across the Ozarks. After a few hours, these supercell thunderstorms lessened in strength as they neared the Greater St. Louis metropolitan area.

While the cluster of thunderstorms was tracking through Missouri, a new squall line with embedded supercells developed across eastern Oklahoma and Kansas, demarcating a dry line boundary. Although linear storm systems tend to indicate strong wind events and not tornadoes, these storms tracked eastward into southwestern Missouri and eventually produced several tornadoes. A long-tracked EF3 developed from one of these supercells and struck Cincinnati, Arkansas. At 13:31 UTC on December 31, a tornado watch was issued for much of Missouri and portions of Arkansas and Illinois. Most of the tornadoes during the outbreak stemmed from this line of storms as they moved through Missouri and Illinois throughout the day. At around noon, a new cluster of disorganized showers formed over eastern Louisiana and southern Mississippi. Although these storms were initially weak, they gradually intensified into supercells as the day went on. Additional supercells quickly developed over Louisiana and eventually spread in coverage over Mississippi, resulting in the development of several tornadoes. Reaching their peak strength over Mississippi, the storms gradually lost their intensity as they tracked eastward late on December 31 and into January 1, 2011. By the morning hours of January 1, severe activity had become restricted to the Florida Panhandle and southern Alabama; the last tornado watch issued in association with the 2010 New Year's Eve tornado outbreak was issued for those regions at 15:56 UTC that day.

Confirmed tornadoes

December 30 event

December 31 event

January 1 event

Cincinnati, Arkansas

The deadliest tornado of the 2010 New Year's Eve tornado outbreak moved across extreme eastern Oklahoma and northwestern Arkansas, tracking  and damaging the unincorporated community of Cincinnati, Arkansas. The first tornado warning associated was issued at 12:00 UTC for portions of Adair County in Oklahoma and Benton and Washington counties in Arkansas by the National Weather Service Tulsa, Oklahoma. At around the same time, damaging winds estimated at  tore the roof off of a barn southwest of Westville, Oklahoma; these winds were likely a result of inflow caused by the developing tornado. Post-tornado survey teams concluded that the tornado touched down five minutes later northeast of Westville. Quickly tracking northeast, the tornado snapped 13 large wooden utility poles. Damage in Adair County totaled $60,000. At 12:08 UTC, the tornado crossed the Oklahoma-Arkansas border and moved into Benton County, Arkansas.

At 12:10 UTC, the tornado tracked into Cincinnati, Arkansas, where it reached its peak intensity. Several homes were destroyed or heavily damaged in the southwestern areas of the town. Numerous trees and power poles were knocked down or uprooted. Two people were killed when a mobile home was destroyed, while another person died as he was tending cattle when the barn he occupied collapsed. Seven others were injured in Cincinnati. Several permanent homes were heavily damaged northeast of Cincinnati, and a number of chicken houses, mobile homes, outbuildings, and power poles were destroyed. One woman was critically injured after her mobile home was destroyed; she died of her injuries at a hospital four days later. Damage in Cincinnati and surrounding areas within Benton County reached $1.5 million.

After 12:17 UTC, the tornado's position fluctuated between Benton and Washington counties in northwestern Arkansas. Permanent houses were damaged and mobile homes were destroyed. Numerous trees were uprooted or snapped while many other power poles were snapped. Two people were injured following the destruction of a mobile home within the Ozark National Forest in Benton County, while another person was injured west of Tontitown, Arkansas in Washington County. The tornado finally dissipated northwest of Tontitown at 12:27 UTC after causing four deaths and 10 injuries. Overall, the tornado caused $1.835 million in damage, which was the sixth costliest total during the tornado outbreak.

Fenton–Sunset Hills, Missouri

At 17:22 UTC on December 31, the National Weather Service St. Louis, Missouri issued a tornado warning for a severe squall line capable of producing rain-wrapped tornadoes and wind damage. The warning covered ten counties in Missouri and Illinois straddling the Mississippi River and included St. Louis. Shortly after the warning's issuance, two EF1 tornadoes tracked across Jefferson and St. Louis counties, causing extensive tree damage and minor property damage. However, the most destructive tornado from the passing squall line touched down at 17:48 UTC east-northeast of Murphy, Missouri in northern Jefferson County. Small trees and minor roof damage occurred at the point of this second touch down before the tornado moved northeastward into St. Louis County, where the tornado caused a bulk of its damage and was at its strongest.

A large subdivision near Route 30 sustained minor roof and tree damage, which was rated as EF0 intensity. However, as the tornado was intensifying through the neighborhood, three homes to the subdivision's east suffered more considerable roof and siding damage and was assigned an EF1 damage intensity rating. The tornado then crossed Route 141, where it blew a Honda CR-V into a highway barrier; the driver of the vehicle suffered critical injuries and died 11 days later from those injuries. After crossing the highway, a number of buildings were damaged including a church, elementary school, and parsonage. Damage in this area was rated as EF2 due to the partial debarking of a nearby tree. Minor tree damage occurred as the tornado moved through Fenton Park and tracked over the Meramec River.

After crossing the river, the tornado weakened to EF1 strength, damaging several homes while also leaving behind an interrupted damage path. The tornado crossed I-270 before rapidly intensifying at around 17:56 UTC. Numerous trees were uprooted while many homes sustained considerable damage. Six homes were unroofed and one was destroyed and shifted from its foundation; this damage was rated high-end EF3. The tornado weakened to EF1 intensity afterwards, causing more minor damage to a strip mall and several homes. Six power poles were knocked down shortly before the tornado lifted at 18:00 UTC in western Crestwood, Missouri.

Non-tornadic impacts
Beginning on December 29 and continuing for three days, the storm system associated with the tornado outbreak caused strong winds across the Texas Panhandle and eastern New Mexico. The winds were further enhanced by isolated showers, and gusts peaked at 79 mph (127 km/h) in Tatum, New Mexico. Approximately 7 mi (11 km) west of Levelland, Texas, the winds downed four power poles, sparking a fire that burned nearly 2,000 acres (800 hectares) of grassland before it was finally contained; the fire caused US$20,000 in damage. In Allen, Oklahoma, strong winds associated with one supercell caused an estimated US$20,000 in damage after damaging the carport, chimney, and roof of a house. Hail and strong winds were also reported elsewhere in eastern Oklahoma and southeastern Kansas. Widespread and damaging wind gusts and hail later crossed into northwestern Arkansas, causing US$175,000 in damage. Several buildings and homes were destroyed by the strong winds; similar impacts were seen in Missouri and Illinois.

In Scott County, residents were forced to evacuate out of Forest and Morton due to flash floods that caused $470,000 in damage. Similarly, the inundation washed out roads and flooded cars in Winona. Overall, flood damage in Mississippi amounted to US$1.135 million.

See also

List of North American tornadoes and tornado outbreaks

Footnotes

References

12,31
01,01
Tornadoes,12,31
Tornadoes,01,01
Tornado outbreak,12,13
Tornado outbreak,01,01
F3 tornadoes by date
Tornadoes in Arkansas
Tornadoes in Illinois
Tornadoes in Mississippi
Tornadoes in Missouri